Karen Ramírez (born 21 November 1971 in North London) is an English female dance music singer. At the age of six, Ramirez moved to Trinidad and Tobago and lived there for some time, before returning to London and entering university. In 1998, she had a No. 1 hit single on the U.S. Hot Dance Club Play chart and a No. 8 hit on the UK Singles Chart with her cover version of Everything but the Girl's "I Didn't Know I Was Looking for Love", under the simpler title of "Looking for Love".

Her second album, entitled Bees in the Trees, was released exclusively on iTunes in May 2006.

Discography

Studio albums
Distant Dreams (20 July 1998), Manifesto - UK #45
Distant Dreams (Japan release) (1998), Manifesto/Mercury (three extra tracks: two versions of "Troubled Girl", the Spanish version and the Boris Dlugosch & Michael Lange elusive club mix, and "Fever")
Bees in the Trees (May 2006), self-released

Remix albums
Remixed Dreams (Japan only) (13 January 1999), Mercury

Singles

See also
List of number-one dance hits (United States)
List of artists who reached number one on the US Dance chart

References

1971 births
Living people
English dance musicians
20th-century Black British women singers
21st-century Black British women singers
British people of Trinidad and Tobago descent
Singers from London
Mercury Records artists